Esmail Farivar was an Iranian pan-Iranist politician who served as a member of parliament from 1967 to 1971, representing Rezaiyeh. Farivar was a graduate of political science from University of Tehran, and for some time worked as an attaché at the Iranian embassy in Paris.

References 

 Esmail Farivar Obituary
1927 births
2011 deaths
Pan-Iranist Party politicians
Members of the 22nd Iranian Majlis
Iranian diplomats
Deputies of Urmia
Iranian nationalists